Duane Adkins Kees (born 1975) is an American attorney and former United States Attorney for the United States District Court for the Western District of Arkansas. He previously served as director of global ethics and compliance at Walmart.

Early life and education 

He received his Bachelor of Arts from the University of Arkansas and his Juris Doctor from the University of Arkansas School of Law.

Military service 

Kees attended The JAG School at the University of Virginia and entered the U.S. Army JAG Corps. he served in the JAG Corps for eight years. During his time on active duty, he prosecuted and defended a variety of complex cases and earned two Bronze Stars and a Meritorious Service Medal. He is currently a major in the Arkansas National Guard. Kees was previously a partner at the Asa Hutchinson Law Group.

United States Attorney 

On September 22, 2017, President Donald Trump nominated Kees to be the United States Attorney for the Western District of Arkansas. On December 20, 2017, his nomination was confirmed in the United States Senate by voice vote. He was sworn into office on January 5, 2018. He resigned on January 17, 2020, to return to the private sector.

References

1975 births
Living people
Arkansas lawyers
Lawyers from Little Rock, Arkansas
University of Arkansas alumni
University of Arkansas School of Law alumni
Walmart people
United States Attorneys for the Western District of Arkansas
21st-century American lawyers
The Judge Advocate General's Legal Center and School alumni